Peshastin Pinnacles State Park is a  public recreation area located  northwest of Cashmere in Chelan County, Washington. The state park features  sandstone slabs and spires in a desert environment with views of the surrounding orchards, Enchantment Range, and Wenatchee Valley. Park activities include rock climbing, hiking, birdwatching, and wildlife viewing.

References

External links

Peshastin Pinnacles State Park Washington State Parks and Recreation Commission 
Peshastin Pinnacles State Park Map Washington State Parks and Recreation Commission

Parks in Chelan County, Washington
State parks of Washington (state)
Rock formations of Washington (state)
Protected areas established in 1991
Climbing areas of the United States